Hillbrook is a neighborhood in Northeast Washington, D.C. It is bounded by Nannie Helen Burroughs Avenue to the north, Brooks Street to the south, 44th Street NE to the west, and Division Avenue to the east.

Neighborhoods in Northeast (Washington, D.C.)